Saint Poma was the sister of Saint Memmius (in French "Memmie de Châlons") who is venerated as the first bishop of Châlons-sur-Marne (present-day Châlons-en-Champagne) in France. She lived in the late third century.

Saint Poma's feast day is 27 June.  

Her remains are interred in the Basilica of Saint Memmius in Saint-Memmie, France, near those of her brother and four other men who succeeded him as bishop in Châlons.

References

2nd-century births
3rd-century deaths
2nd-century Roman women
3rd-century Roman women
French Roman Catholic saints
Late Ancient Christian female saints